The 2013–14 Grand Canyon Antelopes men's basketball team represented Grand Canyon University during the 2013–14 college basketball season. This was head coach Dan Majerle's first season at Grand Canyon. The Antelopes competed in the Western Athletic Conference and played their home games at GCU Arena, with one postseason game at Antelope Gymnasium. This season was year 1 of a 4-year transition period from Division II to Division I. As a result, the Antelopes were not eligible to participate in the NCAA Tournament and did not participate WAC Basketball Tournament. However, the Antelopes could have competed in the NIT, CIT, or CBI tournaments, should they be invited. They finished the season 15–15, 10–6 in WAC play, to finish in third place. They were invited to the CollegeInsider.com Tournament, where they lost in the first round to Pacific.

Roster

Schedule and results

|-
!colspan=12 style="background:#522D80; color:#FFFFFF;"| European Tour

|-
!colspan=12 style="background:#522D80; color:#FFFFFF;"| Exhibition

|-
!colspan=12 style="background:#522D80; color:#FFFFFF;"| Regular season

|-
!colspan=12 style="background:#522D80; color:#FFFFFF;"| CIT

Source:

Game Summaries

Exhibition: UC San Diego
Broadcasters: Matt Rosen, Rex Chapman, and Barry Buetel
Series History: Grand Canyon leads the regular season series 10-8

vs. Loyola Marymount
Series History: First Meeting
Broadcasters: Matt Rosen, Rex Chapman & Barry Buetel

San Diego
Series History: Grand Canyon leads 10-8
Broadcasters: Matt Rosen, Rex Chapman & Barry Buetel

References

Grand Canyon Antelopes men's basketball seasons
Grand Canyon
Grand Canyon